Segner is a lunar impact crater located near the southwestern limb of the Moon, to the northeast of the giant walled plain Bailly. The crater Zucchius is a few kilometers to the south-southwest of the rim, and to the north east lies the unusual formation Schiller. The smaller crater Weigel is located to the east.

Segner has a low, worn rim, and is generally much less prominent than the nearby Zucchius. The floor is distinguished only by a pair of small craterlets and a slightly undulating surface. There is no indication of a central peak. A low ridge runs to the north from the edge of the northern rim.

Segner lies within the southwest portion of the Schiller-Zucchius Basin.

Satellite craters
By convention these features are identified on lunar maps by placing the letter on the side of the crater midpoint that is closest to Segner.

References

 
 
 
 
 
 
 
 
 
 
 
 

Impact craters on the Moon